Gianfranco Saba is from 27 June 2017 the elected Archbishop of Sassari.

Family life 

Gianfranco Saba was born in Olbia in 1968, and was ordained as a priest in 1993. He continued his theological studies at Pontifical Faculty of Theology of Sardinia, and specialized at Patristic Institute Augustinianum. He also specialized at Institut Catholique de Paris.

He was rector of diocesan Seminary of Sassari and from 2000 to 2015 he was rector of Regional pontifical Seminary of Sardinia.

On 27 June 2017 Pope Francis appointed him as the new Archbishop of Sassari. He will be consecrated on 13 September 2013 by bishop of Ozieri Sebastiano Sanguinetti.

Publications 
 Il dialogo sul sacerdozio di Giovanni Crisostomo: sintesi tra paideia classica e paideia cristiana?, Bologna, Dehoniana Libri, 2012, .
 Scienze religiose e processo euromediterraneo, curatela, Soveria Mannelli, Rubbettino, 2009, .
 Albino Morera: l'uomo e il pastore nel contesto socio-religioso nella Diocesi di Tempio-Ampurias, curatela con Angelo Setzi, Soveria Mannelli, Rubbettino, 2004, .

References

External links 
 Official website of the Archdiocese of Sassari 

1968 births
Living people
21st-century Italian Roman Catholic archbishops
People from Olbia
Patristic Institute Augustinianum
Archbishops of Sassari